Whatever You Say, Say Nothing is the fourth studio album by Scottish rock band Deacon Blue, released in 1993.  Changing from producer Jon Kelly to the team of Steve Osborne and Paul Oakenfold, this album presented a change in musical style for Deacon Blue.  While the band's songwriting remained based in rock and blues, many of the tracks moved into alternative rock territory in their presentation.

The album peaked at No. 4 in the UK Albums Chart.

Track listing – CD, cassette and minidisc edition
All songs written by Ricky Ross, except where noted:
 "Your Town" – 5:21
 "Only Tender Love" – 5:10
 "Peace & Jobs & Freedom" – 4:52
 "Hang Your Head" – 4:05
 "Bethlehem's Gate" – 4:47
 "Last Night I Dreamed of Henry Thomas" – 3:45
 "Will We Be Lovers" (Ross, Osborne) – 3:56
 "Fall So Freely Down" – 4:17
 "Cut Lip" – 3:36
 "All Over the World" – 3:28

Track listing – vinyl edition
All songs written by Ricky Ross, except where noted:

Side 1
 "Your Town" – 5:21
 "Only Tender Love" – 5:10
 "Peace & Jobs & Freedom" – 4:52
 "Hang Your Head" – 4:05
 "Bethlehem's Gate" – 4:47
Side 2
 "Will We Be Lovers" (Ross, Osborne) – 3:56
 "Fall So Freely Down" – 4:17
 "Cut Lip" – 3:36
 "Last Night I Dreamed of Henry Thomas" – 3:45
 "All Over the World" – 3:28

2012 reissue
A deluxe remastered edition of the album was released by Edsel Records on 29 October 2012, containing all of the B-sides and remixes from the album's era.

Personnel
Ricky Ross – vocals, guitar, piano, keyboard
Lorraine McIntosh – vocal
James Prime – keyboard
Ewen Vernal – bass
Graeme Kelling – guitar
Dougie Vipond – drums

References

External links
Deacon Blue's official website page on the album

1993 albums
Deacon Blue albums
Albums produced by Steve Osborne
Columbia Records albums